Gangsters is a 1992 Italian drama film directed by Massimo Guglielmi. It was entered into the 18th Moscow International Film Festival.

Plot
Genoa, 1945, after the end of the Second World War Umberto, Giulio and Enrico, three partisans, intend to continue their struggle killing the fascists, responsible for the murders and the tortures against the anti-fascists, who were not captured or they went unpunished. Their actions, however, do not have an exclusive punitive or vengeance aim, hoping that the fight will continue throughout the country, up to the revolution.

The Italian Communist Party, however, distances itself from these actions and, having learned of the identity of the three, sends the official Bava, acquaintance of the three and a friend of Giulio, to warn him to stop but the attempt will not succeed.

Cast
 Ennio Fantastichini as Giulio
 Isabella Ferrari as Evelina
 Giuseppe Cederna as Umberto
 Giulio Scarpati as Enrico
 Luca Lionello as Franco
 Claudio Bigagli as Nicola
 Mattia Sbragia as the Carabinieri lieutenant
 Ivano Marescotti as Bava
 Maria Monti as the guest-house owner

References

External links
 

1992 films
1992 drama films
Italian drama films
1990s Italian-language films
Films scored by Armando Trovajoli
1990s Italian films